"Hallo K3" is the first single to be released from Flemish/Dutch girl group K3's eleventh studio album Eyo!. It was written by Miquel Wiels,  A. Putte, P. Gillis, and produced by Studio 100. The song is also the intro for the same-named K3 sitcom Hallo K3

Track listing
 Hallo K3
 Hallo K3 (Instrumental)

Charts

Weekly charts

Year-end charts

References
www.musicstore.nl
www.studio100fan.eu

2010 singles
2010 songs